SOP Gigsters is a Philippine television variety show broadcast by GMA Network. Hosted by Richard Gutierrez and Raymond Gutierrez, it premiered on June 13, 2004. The show concluded on October 22, 2006.

It featured young stars and ran texting promos where viewers had a chance to win gadgets and cash prizes by subscribing through Fanatxt.

Cast
Hosts
 Richard Gutierrez (2004–2006)
 Raymond Gutierrez (2004–2006)

Performers
 Chuck Allie (2006)
 Nicole Andersson (2004–2006)
 Gian Carlos (2006)
 Rainier Castillo (2004–2006)
 Marky Cielo (2006)
 Ryza Cenon (2005–2006)
 JC De Vera (2004–2006)
 Jacque Esteves
 Sheena Halili (2004–2006)
 Mark Herras (2004–2006)
 Yasmien Kurdi (2004–2006)
 Jade Lopez (2004–2006)
 Ehra Madrigal
 Jennylyn Mercado (2004–2006)
 Iwa Moto (2006)
 C. J. Muere (2005–2006)
 Rhian Ramos (2006)
 LJ Reyes (2005–2006)
 Jackie Rice (2006)
 Jana Roxas (2006)
 Mike Tan (2005–2006)
 Iya Villania (2004)

References

External links
 

2004 Philippine television series debuts
2006 Philippine television series endings
Filipino-language television shows
GMA Network original programming
Philippine variety television shows